Dylan Murcott (born August 6, 1992) is an American sports car racing driver who currently races in the Michelin Pilot Challenge. He also competed in stock car racing as a road course ringer in the NASCAR Xfinity Series; in 2018, he drove the No. 8 Chevrolet for B. J. McLeod Motorsports.

Racing career

Continental Tire SportsCar Challenge
In 2017, Murcott and Dillon Machavern drove the No. 28 Porsche Cayman GT4 MR for Team RS1, and became the champions of the season's GS class despite only winning one race.

NASCAR Xfinity Series
Murcott debuted in the Xfinity Series in 2018. He drove the No. 55 Toyota for JP Motorsports at Mid-Ohio. He started 34th, but crashed out of the race early on due to a brake failure and finished last.

He then drove the No. 8 Chevrolet for B. J. McLeod Motorsports at Charlotte. He started 33rd and finished 30th.

Motorsports career results

NASCAR
(key) (Bold – Pole position awarded by qualifying time. Italics – Pole position earned by points standings or practice time. * – Most laps led.)

Xfinity Series

References

External links
 

Living people
1992 births
NASCAR drivers
Racing drivers from New York (state)
Michelin Pilot Challenge drivers